Stuartburn is a small, primarily Ukrainian community in southeastern Manitoba, Canada and situated in the Rural Municipality of Stuartburn. Stuartburn is considered to be the first Ukrainian community in western Canada.

It borders the rural municipalities of Emerson-Franklin, Hanover, La Broquerie, and Piney, as well as Kittson and Roseau Counties in Minnesota in the United States.

History 
The first Ukrainian immigrants arrived in Winnipeg in July 1896 en route to Stuartburn, which is considered to be the first Ukrainian community in western Canada.

It is also a little-known fact that the first Ukrainian Catholic Church in Canada was established in Stuartburn in 1896 (Ukrainian Catholic Archeparchy of Canada), one kilometre east of Stuartburn. The original burned down, and it took over 20 years to rebuild. During the reconstruction, mass was held wherever available, the hall, barn or the local clergy's house, until the church could be rebuilt. Outside on top of the dome is yet another, mini-dome with beautifully crafted wrought iron.

References

External links
Stuartburn community profile

Unincorporated communities in Eastman Region, Manitoba
Ukrainian-Canadian communities in Manitoba